About Anglia was a regional news magazine programme produced by Anglia Television in the east of England, broadcast for over thirty years from 2 June 1960 to 6 July 1990.

History
One of the first regional programmes of its kind in the ITV, About Anglia began in May 1960 as a twice-weekly programme, accompanying the ten-minute regional evening news bulletin on weekdays.

Its success prompted it to be extended to four nights a week the following September, and then, every weeknight. Its original main presenter was Dick Joice.

Features
Early regular features included gardening, Police Call and in-depth weather forecasts for the region provided by Anglia's in-house weather department.

Some early elements of About Anglia featured on the short-lived Midday Show, which aired during the first few months of the station, and featured Susan Hampshire among its cast.

Transmission
The programme was transmitted throughout the Anglia region: Norfolk, Suffolk, Essex, Cambridgeshire, Northamptonshire, Bedfordshire, Hertfordshire, Buckinghamshire, Lincolnshire and east Yorkshire.

From 1 January 1974, East Yorkshire, Lincolnshire and parts of north Norfolk (served by the Belmont transmitter) were transferred to the Yorkshire Television area, although the Anglia weather department continued to produced special regional forecasts for the area for several years.

Demise
About Anglia was given a new, modern look on Monday 21 March 1988 when Anglia Television abandoned its original identification, a small silver statue of a knight on horseback.

Two years later, on Monday 9 July 1990, About Anglia was replaced by Anglia News, which transmitted two programmes:
Anglia News East for Norfolk, Suffolk, Essex and parts of Cambridgeshire
Anglia News West for Northamptonshire, Bedfordshire, North Hertfordshire, North Buckinghamshire, South Lincolnshire and the rest of Cambridgeshire.

Both were produced and broadcast from studios at Anglia House in Norwich, long before this became standard practice across ITV regional news services, with reporters in Ipswich, Chelmsford, Cambridge, Peterborough, Northampton, Luton and Milton Keynes, along with a political bureaux at Westminster.

Cutbacks in 2009 led to the reintroduction of a pan-regional programme (known as Anglia Tonight) with shorter sub-regional opt outs - which have since been extended under ITV News Anglia.

Presenters 
Many About Anglia personalities moved on to national prominence.

In 1960, David Dimbleby spent his summer vacation from Oxford University working as an About Anglia reporter. The same year also saw David Frost join the reporting team - infamously, his contract was not renewed by Anglia Television, reputedly because management felt he did not have a future in regional television.
Judy Finnigan came to Anglia in the mid-1970s from Granada Television as a reporter and presenter. She married and settled in Norwich, making her name in 1977 when she gave birth to twin sons and, the following day, showed the babies on About Anglia. She left to return to Granada as co-host of Granada Reports.
Bob Wellings, covering offbeat stories, became a presenter of BBC Television's current affairs Nationwide programme in 1971, staying there until 1979.
Alastair Yates joined About Anglia in 1987 following a period with Grampian Television's North Tonight, but left two years later to become the first presenter on Sky News in Britain.

Other presenters and journalists who regularly appeared include:

Tony Adams
Patrick Anthony 
Rebecca Atherstone
John Bacon
Greg Barnes
Paul Barnes
Surrey Beddows
Graham Bell
Vic Birtles
Malcolm Brabant
Lindsay Brooke
Griselda Cann
Stephen Chambers
Stephen Cole
David Delvin (the show's resident medical expert)
Geoff Druett
David Geary
Dick Graham
Anne Gregg
Lionel Hampden

Gerry Harrison
David Henshaw
Stuart Jarrold
David Jennings
Chris Kelly
John Kiddey
Alison Leigh
Peter Lugg
Helen McDermott
Guy Michelmore
Caroline Oldrey (presenter of the last About Anglia)
Jeremy Payne
Jane Probyn
Caroline Raison
Pam Rhodes
Steve Rider
Owen Spencer-Thomas
Christine Webber
Chris Young

References

1960 British television series debuts
1960s British television series
1970s British television series
1980s British television series
1990s British television series
1990 British television series endings
English-language television shows
ITV regional news shows
Television series by ITV Studios
Television news in England
Television shows produced by Anglia Television